Peter Stefan Dyakowski (born April 19, 1984) is a Canadian football offensive lineman who is currently a free agent. He was most recently a member of the Saskatchewan Roughriders of the Canadian Football League (CFL). He played for the Hamilton Tiger-Cats from 2007 to 2016. In 2012, he was named Canada's Smartest Person by the Canadian Broadcasting Corporation. Dyakowski also serves as Treasurer of the Canadian Football League Players' Association (CFLPA).

Early years 
Dyakowski did not start playing football until he entered Grade 10 at Vancouver College. After high school, he signed a national letter of intent to play for Louisiana State Tigers and signed a football scholarship for the Louisiana State University.

In his early years at LSU he was nicknamed "The Mullet" because of his hair style, and captured a national title in 2004. In 2003 and 2004 he was a member of the SEC Academic Honor Roll. Then, as a senior at LSU he received the Southeastern Conference Community Service Team Player of the Week Award and was LSU's nominee for the 2006 Southeastern Conference Football Good Works Team.

He was named to ESPN.com's All Bowl Team and played in the Inta Juice North-South All Star Game following his senior season at LSU.

Professional career

New Orleans Saints 
He was not picked by any team in the 2007 NFL draft, but signed a free agent contract with the New Orleans Saints shortly thereafter. Nevertheless he was subsequently released.

Hamilton Tiger-Cats 
Dyakowski was drafted by the Hamilton Tiger-Cats in the second round of the 2006 CFL Draft. In 2011 Dyakowski was the Tiger-Cats' nominee for the CFL's Most Outstanding Offensive Lineman Award.  In 2012, he was named a CFL Eastern Division All Star and was also named to the CFLPA All-Star Team.  In 2013, he was again voted to the CFLPA All-Star Team. On February 16, 2017, the Tiger Cats released Dyakowski. Dyakowski played 10 seasons for the Tiger-Cats, playing in 148 regular season games.

Toronto Argonauts 
After being released by the Tiger-Cats Dyakowski signed with the Toronto Argonauts later that same day.

Saskatchewan Roughriders 
On May 27, 2017, the Argonauts traded Dyakowski to the Saskatchewan Roughriders in exchange for wide receiver Armanti Edwards. He would go on to play in all 18 regular season games, and the Riders' playoff games of the 2017 season. Dyakowski was released by the Riders on April 24, 2018.

Politics
In February 2019, Dyakowski was selected to run as the Conservative Party of Canada candidate for the riding of Hamilton Mountain in the 2019 Canadian federal election. Dyakowski vowed to fight for workers rights and to promote the economic revitalization of Canada.

Other activities
Dyakowski appeared on an episode of Jeopardy! broadcast on Tuesday, June 3, 2014, finishing in third place.

Dyakowski attended the same elementary school as Canadian performer and playwright Katherine Cullen, and is the subject of the song "Peter Dyakowski Won" in Stupidhead!, Cullen's autobiographical comedic musical about growing up with dyslexia.

Electoral record

References

External links 
Saskatchewan Roughriders bio 
Hamilton Tiger-Cats bio 
2006 LSU Tigers
LSU Tigers

1984 births
Living people
Canadian players of American football
Hamilton Tiger-Cats players
LSU Tigers football players
Canadian football people from Vancouver
Jeopardy! contestants
Conservative Party of Canada candidates for the Canadian House of Commons
Toronto Argonauts players
Saskatchewan Roughriders players
Players of Canadian football from British Columbia
American football offensive linemen
Canadian football offensive linemen
Canadian sportsperson-politicians